Robert Hoy (born 10 January 1950 in Halifax) is a former professional footballer who made 273 appearances and scored 38 goals in the Football League playing as a midfielder for Huddersfield Town, Halifax Town, Blackburn Rovers, York City and Rochdale. He went on to play non-league football for Macclesfield Town.

References

1950 births
Living people
Footballers from Halifax, West Yorkshire
English footballers
Association football wingers
Huddersfield Town A.F.C. players
Blackburn Rovers F.C. players
Halifax Town A.F.C. players
York City F.C. players
Rochdale A.F.C. players
Macclesfield Town F.C. players
English Football League players